Aleksei Vasiliev or Alexey Vasilyev may refer to:

Alexei Vasiliev (ice hockey, born 1977), Russian professional ice hockey defenceman
Aleksei Vasiliev (ice hockey, born 1984), Russian professional ice hockey forward
Aleksei Vasilyev (footballer) (born 1987), Russian footballer
Aleksey Vasilyev (racing driver) (born 1972), Russian auto racing driver
Alexei Mikhailovich Vasiliev (born 1939), Russian Africanist, director of Institute of African Studies

See also
Aleksandr Vasilyev (disambiguation)
Alexander Vasilyev (disambiguation)